Onthophilus is a genus of clown beetles in the family Histeridae. There are more than 40 described species in Onthophilus. Fossils of the genus have been discovered in Burmese amber, estimated to be 100 million years old.

Species
These 41 species belong to the genus Onthophilus:

 Onthophilus affinis Redtenbacher, 1849
 Onthophilus alternatus (Say, 1825)
 Onthophilus aonoi Ôhara & Nakane, 1986
 Onthophilus australis Helawa & Howden, 1977
 Onthophilus bickhardti Reitter, 1909
 Onthophilus convictor Normand, 1919
 Onthophilus cynomysi Helava, 1978
 Onthophilus deflectus Helava, 1978
 Onthophilus extraordinarius Reichardt, 1941
 Onthophilus flavicornis Lewis, 1884
 Onthophilus flohri Lewis, 1888
 Onthophilus foveipennis Lewis, 1885
 Onthophilus giganteus Helava, 1978
 Onthophilus globulosus (Olivier, 1789)
 Onthophilus heilogjiangensis Ji Lingke, 1993
 Onthophilus intermedius Handschin, 1944
 Onthophilus intermixtus Helava, 1978
 Onthophilus irregularis Howden & Laplante, 2003
 Onthophilus jakli Kapler, 1993
 Onthophilus julii Lewis, 1892
 Onthophilus kamiyai Adachi, 1930
 Onthophilus kirni Ross, 1944
 Onthophilus lecontei Horn, 1870
 Onthophilus lijiangensis Zhou & Lou, 2002
 Onthophilus melampus Reichardt, 1933
 Onthophilus niponensis Lewis, 1907
 Onthophilus nodatus J. E. LeConte, 1844
 Onthophilus ordinarius Lewis, 1879
 Onthophilus ostreatus Lewis, 1879
 Onthophilus pluricostatus J. E. LeConte, 1844
 Onthophilus punctatus (O. F. Müller, 1776)
 Onthophilus reyesi Kryzhanovskij, 1992
 Onthophilus rugatus Therond
 Onthophilus sculptilis Lewis, 1892
 Onthophilus silvae Lewis, 1884
 Onthophilus smetanai Mazur, 1994
 Onthophilus soltaui Casey, 1893
 Onthophilus striatus (Forster, 1771)
 Onthophilus thomomysi Helava, 1978
 Onthophilus tuberculatus Lewis, 1892
 Onthophilus wenzeli Helava, 1978

References

Further reading

External links

 

Histeridae
Articles created by Qbugbot